Santoshpur is a village in Bhatar CD block in Bardhaman Sadar North subdivision of Purba Bardhaman district in the state of West Bengal, India.

History
Census 2011 Santoshpur Village Location Code or Village Code 319829. The village of Santoshpur is located in the Bhatar tehsil of Burdwan district in West Bengal, India.

Demographics
The total geographic area of the village is 239.14 hectares. Santoshpur features a total population of 1,963 peoples. There are about 473 houses in Santoshpur village. Ratanpur is nearest Village to Kumarun, which is approximately 2 km away.

Caste
Schedule Caste (SC) constitutes 22.72% while Schedule Tribe (ST) were 0.10% of total population in Santoshpur village.

Population and house data

Work
In Santoshpur village out of the total population, 678 were engaged in work activities. 95.87% of workers describe their work as Main Work (Employment or Earning more than 6 Months) while 4.13% were involved in Marginal activity providing livelihood for less than 6 months. Of 678 workers engaged in Main Work, 164 were cultivators (owner or co-owner) while 282 were agricultural labourer.

Transport 

Healthcare
Nearest Rural Hospital at Bhatar (with 60 beds) is the main medical facility in Bhatar CD block. There are primary health centres.

External links
 Map
 Ratanpur

References 

Villages in Purba Bardhaman district